The 1992–93 Serie A season was the 59th season of the Serie A, the top level of ice hockey in Italy. Nine teams participated in the league, and HC Devils Milano won the championship by defeating HC Bozen in the final.

Regular season

Playoffs

External links
 Season on hockeyarchives.info

1992–93 in Italian ice hockey
Serie A (ice hockey) seasons
Italy